704 Hauser is an American sitcom television series and a spin-off of All in the Family (the final of several) that aired on CBS from April 11 to May 9, 1994. The series is built around the concept of a black family, the Cumberbatch Family, moving into the former Queens home of Archie Bunker after Bunker had sold the house located at 704 Hauser Street.

Overview

Norman Lear created the series during the time when conservative talk radio was experiencing its initial upswing in popularity in the United States, particularly in the form of Rush Limbaugh. Lear felt that the time was right for a new show to explore new issues, making 704 Hauser even more explicitly political than All in the Family.
John Amos, a veteran of the earlier Lear sitcom Good Times (itself a spin-off of the All in the Family spin-off Maude), starred as Ernie Cumberbatch, while Lynnie Godfrey played his wife, Rose. The show features a reversal of the original All in the Family formula. Ernie and Rose Cumberbatch are working class Democrats, while their son Goodie is a conservative activist and his girlfriend, Cherlyn Markowitz (Maura Tierney), is white and Jewish.

The show attracted middling ratings, and was cancelled after five episodes (with one episode remaining unaired).

Cast
 John Amos as Ernie Cumberbatch
 Lynnie Godfrey as Rose Cumberbatch
 T.E. Russell as Thurgood Marshall 'Goodie' Cumberbatch
 Maura Tierney as Cherlyn Markowitz

Casey Siemaszko plays Joey Stivic, Archie's grandson, in the first episode. CBS anchor Bob Schieffer appears in the first episode as himself.

List of episodes

Home media
The pilot episode, "Meet the Cumberbatchs", was included as a bonus feature on the All in the Family: The Complete Series DVD box set released by Shout! Factory on October 30, 2012.

References

External links
 

All in the Family
1994 American television series debuts
1994 American television series endings
1990s American black sitcoms
American television spin-offs
CBS original programming
Television series by Sony Pictures Television
Television series by Castle Rock Entertainment
English-language television shows
Television shows set in New York City
Television series created by Norman Lear
Queens, New York, in fiction